Commewijne River (Sranan Tongo: Kawina-liba) is a river in northern Suriname.

It originates in the hills of the Commewijne District and flows northwards until it receives the meandering Cottica River from the right and then runs westward until it unites with the south–north running Suriname River at Nieuw Amsterdam. Here, after some  it enters the Atlantic Ocean.

The Commewijne was important historically for navigation: ocean-going ships navigated the river huge barges with bauxite were transported from Moengo in the east to the confluence with the Surinam river and from there traveled southward via Paramaribo to the Paranam refinery and to Trinidad and the USA. Floats with tropical hardwood were also brought to Paramaribo, the capital of Suriname. Nowadays, the Moengo bauxite is depleted and the hardwood is mostly transported by trucks. The ocean-going ships were trading the river as late as 1986. There remains quite some boat trafficking with local residents and tourists.

The Commewijne River was known in the 16th and 17th centuries as "Camaiwini" and "Cammawini". Today's name "Commewijne" is probably derived from Arawak words "kama" (tapir) and "wini" (water/river).

References 
 

Rivers of Suriname
Commewijne District